The Vijay Awards are presented by the Tamil television channel STAR Vijay to honour excellence in Tamil cinema. It has been given annually since 2006, with the latest—the 10th edition—of the award-giving ceremony having been held in May 2018. The awards are decided by a jury, consisting of noted film-makers, critics and technicians, while winners in a separate category named "Favourite awards" are chosen by public voting. The awards have been sponsored by Reliance Mobile, Univercell and Close Up. After the last ceremony was the 10th Vijay Awards in 2018, the Vijay Awards were cancelled due to past controversies and waning public interest.

History
The first edition of the awards was held to select the most popular artists, however not for any particular work or year. In the first year of the awards, viewers were asked to choose their all time favourite film and artists in nine categories - Favourite Hero, Heroine, Film, Director, Music Director, Playback Singer Male/Female, Villain and Comedian - while 10 Jury Special Awards were also introduced. The format was completely reworked for the following year and from 2008 onwards, the works of the preceding year were honoured, with the majority of prizes being selected by a committee, while awards in five categories (Favourite Hero, Heroine, Film, Director and Song) chosen by public voting. The award for Favourite Song was introduced in 2008.

Awards

Jury Awards
 Best Film
 Best Director
 Best Actor
 Best Actress
 Best Supporting Actor
 Best Supporting Actress
 Best Comedian
 Best Villain
 Best Debut Actor
 Best Debut Actress
 Best Music Director
 Best Cinematographer
 Best Editor
 Best Art Director
 Best Male Playback Singer
 Best Female Playback Singer
 Best Lyricist
 Best Dialogue Writer
 Best Story, Screenplay Writer
 Best Choreographer
 Best Stunt Director
 Best Make Up
 Best Costume Designer
 Best Find of the Year
 Best Crew
 Contribution to Tamil Cinema
 Vijay Award for Entertainer of the Year
 Chevalier Sivaji Ganesan Award for Excellence in Indian Cinema
 Vijay Special Jury Award

Favourite awards
 Favourite Hero
 Favourite Heroine
 Favourite Film
 Favourite Director
 Favourite Song
 Favourite Music Director (2006 only)
 A R Rahman
 Favourite Villain (2006 only)
 Prakash Raj
 Favourite Comedian (2006 only)
 Vivek
 Favourite Playback Singer (Male) (2006 only)
 S. P. Balasubrahmanyam
 Favourite Playback Singer (Female) (2006 only)
 S Janaki
 Vijay Award for Icon of the Year 
 Vijay (2007)
 Vikram (2006)

Ceremony
The ceremony is held every year at the Jawaharlal Nehru Indoor Stadium in Chennai and is telecasted on STAR Vijay only. However, it is not televised live. Except for the first edition, the ceremonies are held in May, June or July, though always before the announcement of the Filmfare Awards South.

Superlatives
Most Awards to a Single person
 Vijay (actor) - 9
 Kamal Haasan - 8
 Dhanush - 7
 Nayanthara - 6

Most Awards to a Single person in a single year
 Kamal Haasan - 4 (3rd Vijay Awards)

Most Awards to a Single film
 Vaaranam Aayiram - 7
 Thuppakki - 6
 Dasavatharam - 6
 Kadal - 6

Most Nominations to a Single person
Dhanush - 23
Suriya - 15
 Harris Jayaraj - 15
 Vijay - 14
 Yuvan Shankar Raja - 10

Most Nominations to a Single film
Aadukalam - 22
Thuppakki - 16
Vaaranam Aayiram - 15
Vinnaithaandi Varuvaayaa - 15
Raja Rani - 15

See also
 Tamil cinema
 Cinema of India

References

External links
 
 Official website

 
Awards established in 2006
2006 establishments in Tamil Nadu
Tamil film awards